Hands (stylized as hands) is Japanese R&B-turned-pop star Koda Kumi's 14th domestic single. The single charted No. 7 and remained on the charts for eight weeks.

Information
hands is Japanese singer-songwriter Kumi Koda's fourteenth single. It charted low in the top ten at No. 7 on the Oricon charts and remained on the charts for two months.

The single became her third to be released as both CD and CD+DVD. It was the end theme of ANB's television program Uchimura Produce (内村プロデュース / Uchimura PURODYUUSI). The b-side, Through the Sky, was the end theme of Nippon TV's informational program The Sunday (THE・サンデー) through the month of January.

The music video released on the single differed from the music video released on the corresponding album, secret, which contained an "album version" that held different scenes. The "single version" was, however, placed on her first compilation album, Best ~first things~.

Music video
The music video for hands carried a theme of a woman trying to cope with her depression brought on by being in the spotlight and having everyone focused on her.

An alternate version to the video was placed on the corresponding album, secret. This would make it the first time she released an "alternate version" of a music video. The "album version" featured different scenes, but still kept the camera close for a more intimate feeling.

Track list
(Source)

Alternate Versions
hands
hands: Found on the single and corresponding album secret (2005)
hands [Instrumental]: Found on the single (2005)
hands [The Standard Club Remix]: Found on Koda Kumi Driving Hit's 2 (2010)

References

External links
Avex Network (2005), Kumi Koda Official Web Site
Oricon Style (2005), Ranking – Oricon Style

2005 singles
2005 songs
Koda Kumi songs
Rhythm Zone singles
Songs written by Koda Kumi

fr:Hand (homonymie)#Musique